The 2017–18 Premier League Cup was the fifth edition of the competition. The defending champions were Swansea City, who won the 2016–17 competition.

Participants

Category 1
Aston Villa
Birmingham City
Blackburn Rovers
Brighton & Hove Albion
Burnley
Derby County
Everton
Leicester City
Liverpool
Middlesbrough
Newcastle United
Norwich City
Nottingham Forest
Southampton
Stoke City
Sunderland
West Bromwich Albion
Wolverhampton Wanderers

Category 2 
Barnsley
Bristol City
Cardiff City
Charlton Athletic
Colchester United
Hull City
Ipswich Town
Sheffield United
Swansea City
Watford

Category 3 
AFC Bournemouth
Bristol Rovers
Bury
Dagenham & Redbridge
Exeter City
Portsmouth
Southend United
Wigan Athletic

Qualifying round 
A qualifying round was required to finalise the 32 teams that would enter the Group Stage.

Group stage 
Teams play each other twice, with the group winners and runners–up advance to the round of 16.

Group A

Group B

Group C

Group D

Group E

Group F

Group G

Group H

Knockout stages

Round of 16

Quarter–final

Semi–final

Final 

 

 

|-
|colspan=4|Substitutes:
|-
 
 
 
 

|-
|colspan=4|Coach:  Cameron Toshack
|-

 
 

 

 
 

|-
|colspan=4|Substitutes:
|-

 
 

|-
|colspan=4|Coach:  Mark Delaney
|-

See also 

 2017–18 Professional U23 Development League
 2017–18 FA Youth Cup

References 

2017–18 in English football
Premier League Cup (football)